Francesca Rio (born 16 December 1990) is an Italian former competitive figure skater. She won ten senior international medals and four Italian national medals (three silver, one bronze). She represented Italy at five ISU Championships, reaching the free skate at the 2009 Junior Worlds in Sofia, 2009 Europeans in Helsinki, 2010 Junior Worlds in The Hague, and 2012 Europeans in Sheffield. She also competed at two Winter Universiades – 2011 (Erzurum) and 2013 (Trento). An injury having disrupted her intended final competitive season, Rio retired in November 2014.

Programs

Competitive highlights     
JGP: Junior Grand Prix

References

External links

 
 Francesca Rio at Tracings.net

1990 births
Living people
Italian female single skaters
Sportspeople from Como
Competitors at the 2013 Winter Universiade
Competitors at the 2011 Winter Universiade
20th-century Italian women
21st-century Italian women